Chilworth railway station serves the village of Chilworth, Surrey, England. The station, and all trains serving it, are operated by the Great Western Railway. It is on the North Downs Line,  measured from  via .

History

British Railways destaffed the station in November 1967. The signalling controls were transferred to the two nearest staffed signal boxes at Shalford and Gomshall, for control of the track in between. The signal box was then officially closed. The original Victorian footbridge and road crossing gates from the station were removed, and sold for £1 to the artist David Shepherd. They were transported on BRS low loader trucks to Somerset, for re-use on the East Somerset Railway, Cranmore.

Services

References

Railway stations in Surrey
Former South Eastern Railway (UK) stations
Railway stations in Great Britain opened in 1849
Railway stations served by Great Western Railway
1849 establishments in England